Lionel Shriver (born Margaret Ann Shriver; May 18, 1957) is an American author and journalist who lives in the United Kingdom. Her novel We Need to Talk About Kevin won the Orange Prize for Fiction in 2005.

Early life and education
Shriver was born Margaret Ann Shriver, in Gastonia, North Carolina, to a religious family. Her father, Donald, is a Presbyterian minister who became an academic and president of the Union Theological Seminary in New York; her mother was a homemaker. At age 15, she changed her name from Margaret Ann to Lionel because she did not like the name she had been given and, as a tomboy, felt a conventionally male name was more appropriate.

Shriver was educated at Barnard College of Columbia University (BA, MFA). She has lived in Nairobi, Bangkok and Belfast, and currently resides in London. She has taught metalsmithing at Buck's Rock Performing and Creative Arts Camp in New Milford, Connecticut.

Writing

Fiction
Shriver had written eight novels, of which seven had been published, before she wrote We Need to Talk About Kevin, which she called her "make or break" novel due to the years of "professional disappointment" and "virtual obscurity" preceding it.

In an interview with Bomb magazine, Shriver listed the various subjects of her novels up to the publication of We Need to Talk About Kevin: "anthropology and first love, rock-and-roll drumming and immigration, the Northern Irish Troubles, demography and epidemiology, inheritance, tennis and spousal competition, [and] terrorism and cults of personality". Rather than writing traditionally sympathetic characters, Shriver prefers to create characters who are "hard to love."

We Need to Talk About Kevin was awarded the 2005 Orange Prize. The novel is a study of maternal ambivalence, and the role it might have played in the title character's decision to murder nine people at his high school. It provoked much controversy and achieved success through word of mouth. She said this about We Need To Talk About Kevin becoming a success:
I'm often asked did something happen around the time I wrote Kevin. Did I have some revelation or transforming event? The truth is that Kevin is of a piece with my other work. There's nothing special about Kevin. The other books are good too. It just tripped over an issue that was just ripe for exploration and by some miracle found its audience. The novel was adapted into the 2011 film of the same name, starring Tilda Swinton and Ezra Miller.

In 2009, she donated the short story "Long Time, No See" to Oxfam's "Ox-Tales" project, four collections of UK stories written by 38 authors. Her story was published in the Fire collection.

Shriver's book So Much for That was published on March 2, 2010. In the novel, Shriver presents a biting criticism of the U.S. health care system. It was named as a finalist for the National Book Award in fiction. Her work The New Republic was published in 2012. It was written in 1998, but failed to find a publisher at the time.

Her 2013 book, Big Brother: A Novel, was inspired by the morbid obesity of one of her brothers.

The Mandibles: A Family, 2029–2047, published in May 2016, is set in a near-future in which the United States is unable to repay its national debt and Mexico has built a wall on its northern border to keep out US citizens trying to escape with their savings. Members of the moneyed Mandible family must contend with disappointment and struggle to survive after the inheritance they had been counting on turns out to have turned to ash. A sister bemoans a shortage of olive oil, while another has to absorb strays into her increasingly cramped household. Her oddball teenage son Willing, an economics autodidact, looks as if he can save the once august family from the streets. The novel was "not science fiction", Shriver told BBC Radio 4's Front Row on May 9, 2016. It is an "acid satire" in which "everything bad that could happen ... has happened" according to the review in the Literary Review.

Journalism
Shriver has written for The Wall Street Journal, the Financial Times, The New York Times, The Economist, Harper's, and other publications. plus the Radio Ulster program Talkback. In July 2005, Shriver began writing a column for The Guardian, in which she shared her opinions on maternal disposition within Western society, the pettiness of British government authorities, and the importance of libraries (she plans to will whatever assets remain at her death to the Belfast Library Board, out of whose libraries she checked many books when she lived in Northern Ireland). 

Shriver currently writes for The Spectator. Shriver occasionally contributes to the "Comment" page of The Times, standing in while regular columnist Matthew Parris is away. In a 2022 "Comment" article, she argued that "Putin could nuke Ukraine and get away with it".

Shriver has argued against migration into the UK, in 2021 she wrote an article which stated "For westerners to passively accept and even abet incursions by foreigners so massive that the native-born are effectively surrendering their territory without a shot fired is biologically perverse."

Activism
Shriver criticised the American health system in an interview in May 2010 while at the Sydney Writers' Festival in Australia, in which she said she was "exasperated with the way that medical matters were run in my country" and considers that she is taking "my life in my hands. Most of all I take my bank account in my hands because if I take a wrong turn on my bike and get run over by a taxi, I could lose everything I have."

As the 2016 keynote speaker at the Brisbane Writers' Festival, Shriver gave a controversial speech critical of the concept of cultural appropriation which led the festival to "pull its links to Shriver’s speech and publicly disavow her point of view." Shriver had previously been criticized for her depiction of Latino and African American characters in her book The Mandibles, which was described by one critic as racist and by another as politically misguided. In her Writers' Festival speech, Shriver contested these criticisms of her book, stating that writers should be entitled to write from any perspective, race, gender or background that they choose.

In June 2018, she criticized an effort by the publisher Penguin Random House to diversify the authors that it published and better represent the population, saying that it prioritized diversity over quality and that a manuscript "written by a gay transgender Caribbean who dropped out of school at seven" would be published "whether or not said manuscript is an incoherent, tedious, meandering and insensible pile of mixed-paper recycling". Penguin Random House marketer and author Candice Carty-Williams criticized the statements. As a result of her comments Shriver was dropped from judging a competition for the magazine Mslexia.

Shriver expressed her opposition to woke and identity politics in a 2021 interview with The Evening Standard, stating that "I don't like discrimination of any kind" but adding "there is nothing malign, initially at least, in the impulse to pursue a fairer society.  The biggest problem with the 'woke’ is their methods - too often involving name calling, silencing, vengefulness, and predation."

Shriver is a patron of UK population growth rate concern group Population Matters, and supported the UK's exit from the European Union.

Personal life
Shriver married jazz drummer Jeff Williams in 2003. They live in Bermondsey, London. 

On June 7, 2016, Shriver appeared on the BBC Radio 4 programme My Teenage Diary, during which she read extracts from her journals from the late 1960s and early 1970s and discussed her upbringing and adolescence.

Bibliography

Fiction 
Novels

 The Female of the Species (1987)
 Checker and the Derailleurs (1988)
 The Bleeding Heart (1990)
 Ordinary Decent Criminals (1992)
 Game Control (1994)
 A Perfectly Good Family (1996)
 Double Fault (1997)
 We Need to Talk About Kevin (2003)
 The Post-Birthday World (2007)
 So Much for That (2010)
 The New Republic (2012)
 Big Brother: A Novel (2013)
 The Mandibles (2016)
 The Standing Chandelier (2017)
 Property (2018)
 The Motion of the Body Through Space (2020)
 Should We Stay or Should We Go (2021)

Short fiction
 Property – Stories Between Two Novellas, 2018 collection

Nonfiction 
 Abominations: Selected Essays from a Career of Courting Self-Destruction (2022)

References

Further reading

External links

 Lionel Shriver at publisher Serpent's Tail
 Two-part interview conducted by Henk de Berg (2018)
 
 

Living people
1957 births
20th-century American novelists
20th-century American women writers
21st-century American novelists
21st-century American women writers
American expatriates in the United Kingdom
American women journalists
American women novelists
Barnard College alumni
Columbia University School of the Arts alumni
People from Gastonia, North Carolina
Novelists from North Carolina
21st-century American non-fiction writers